More Than Words is a 2014 Philippine television drama romantic comedy series broadcast by GMA Network. It premiered on the network's Telebabad line up from November 17, 2014 to March 6, 2015, replacing Ilustrado.

Mega Manila ratings are provided by AGB Nielsen Philippines.

Series overview

Episodes

November 2014

December 2014

January 2015

February 2015

March 2015

References

Lists of Philippine drama television series episodes